Khao poon (also known as Lao royal vermicelli curry soup or Lao laksa and sometimes spelled kapoon, khao poun or khao pun) is a popular type of spicy Lao rice vermicelli soup most often made with pounded chicken, fish, or pork and seasoned with common Lao ingredients such as fish sauce, padaek, lime leaves, galangal, garlic, shallots, Lao chillies, and fish mint. Different versions of the dish are also in Malaysia, Thailand, Indonesia, Cambodia, Singapore, and the United States.

The process of making khao poon could have been brought by the Lao ancestors as they migrated into the Greater Mekong Subregion from Southern China. It is also likey that the khao poon noodles was introduced to Laos by Chinese merchants because Luang Prabang and Vientiane was part of an ancient trade route with China.  Laotians have been making khao poon noodles soup for sale at the market and for their own consumption long before the French arrived in Laos in the 1800s.

Coconut milk curry was probably introduced to Laos during the indianization of the Lao Lan Xang kingdom in the fourteen century by the Khmer, Indian merchants, or even as early as the seventh century by Buddhist monks. Several centuries later Lan Xang would signed a contract with the Dutch East Indian Company and trade directly with the world through the ports of Cambodia.

Khao poon is often described as Lao royal vermicelli coconut curry soup due to its bright red and golden colors representing the colors of the Lao royal family.

The traditional recipes for different types of khao poon served to Laotian royals can be found in a collection of hand written recipes from Phia Sing (1898-1967), the king's personal chef and master of ceremonies. Phia Sing's hand written recipes were complied and published for the first time in 1981.

During the 1950s, André-Yvette Gouineau, the famous French resistance fighter and France's national hero, was a professor at lychee de Vientiane, Laos.  While in the Laos, Gouineau collected several traditional Lao recipes including khao poon. Gouineau described khao poon as a "dish of vermicelli served with raw vegetables and a special sauce; it is very nourishing."

Gouineau's recipe echoed Phia Sing's recipe for khao poon nam phrik. The two recipes consisted of using already cooked pork and fish combined and mashed in a pestle and mortar with spices and herbs before adding the mixture to freshly squeezed coconut milk, padaek, and broth. The dish is served with finely sliced banana flower, bean sprouts and mint. The final plating of khao poon was meticulously described in the recipe as "filling the bottom of the soup bowl with vermicelli, add several pitches of the various raw vegetables according to their taste and preferences and bathe the whole with a generous helping of the creamy sauce.

Various versions of khao poon exist:

Khao poon nam phik, also called khao poon nam kathee (with coconut milk)

Khao poon nam jaew (without coconut milk), khao poon nam par (with fish sauce)

Khao poon nam ped - Lao duck vermicelli curry noodle Soup

Khao poon nam paa - Lao fish vermicelli curry noodle Soup

Khao poon nam gai - Lao chicken vermicelli curry noodle Soup

See also
 Mee ka tee
 Bún (Vietnam)
 Laksa (Indonesia, Malaysia, Singapore)
 List of soups
 Rice noodles
 Rice vermicelli

References

Laotian soups
Southeast Asian curries
Laotian noodle dishes
Noodle soups